Puxin Township, also written Pusin, is a rural township in Changhua County, Taiwan. It has a population of 34,788 and an area of 20.9526 square kilometres.

Demographics
As of January 2023, Puxin had 10,488 households and a total population of 33,816, of which 17,945 were male and 16,843 female.

Administrative divisions
The township is administered as 20 villages: Beijiao, Beixia, Dahua, Erzhong, Jingkou, Jiuguan, Luocuo, Nanguan, Puxin, Qiongjiao, Renli, Taiping, Tungmen, Wabei, Wanan, Wazhong, Wufeng, Xinguan, Yimin and  Youju.

Tourist attractions
 Luocuo Church
 Puxin Township Culture Museum

Notable natives
 Huang Shun-hsing, Magistrate of Taitung County (1964–1968)
 Wei Ming-ku, Magistrate of Changhua County (2014–2018)

References

External links

 Puxin Township Office (in Chinese)

Townships in Changhua County